Hug is a German surname. Notable people with the surname include:

Alexander Hug (ski mountaineer) (born 1975), Swiss ski mountaineer
Alexander Hug (rugby player) (born 1984), German rugby union player
Alfons Hug (born 1950), German curator
Andy Hug (1964-2000), Swiss kickboxer 
Christian Hug (born 1982), German rugby union player
Gary Hug, American astronomer
Johann Leonhard Hug (1765-1846), German theologian
Maja Hug (born 1928), Swiss figure skater
Marcel Hug (born 1986), Swiss wheelchair athlete
Reto Hug (born 1975), Swiss triathlete
Tim Hug (born 1987), Swiss skier
Werner Hug (born 1952), Swiss chess player

German-language surnames
Swiss-German surnames